Christian Dyer (born 26 December 1997) is a United States rugby union player, currently playing for the Houston SaberCats of Major League Rugby (MLR) and the United States national team. His preferred position is centre, wing or fullback.

Professional career
Dyer signed for Major League Rugby side Houston SaberCats for the 2022 Major League Rugby season. 

Dyer debuted for United States against England during the 2021 July rugby union tests.

References

External links
itsrugby.co.uk Profile

1997 births
Living people
United States international rugby union players
Rugby union centres
Rugby union wings
Rugby union fullbacks
American rugby union players
Houston SaberCats players